Carlos Alberto Cunha (21 May 1959 – 10 November 2016) was a Brazilian judoka. He competed in the men's half-middleweight event at the 1980 Summer Olympics.

References

1959 births
2016 deaths
Brazilian male judoka
Olympic judoka of Brazil
Judoka at the 1980 Summer Olympics
Place of birth missing
Pan American Games medalists in judo
Pan American Games gold medalists for Brazil
Judoka at the 1979 Pan American Games
21st-century Brazilian people
20th-century Brazilian people